Robert Bernard Winkelman, Jr., (May 12, 1923 – September 20, 2007) was a Philadelphia businessman and Democratic politician who served on the Philadelphia City Council from 1962 to 1964.

Winkelman was born in Philadelphia in 1923, the son of Robert Winkelman, Sr., and his wife Nora Devitt Winkelman. He married Pauline Petraits, with whom he had three children. After serving in World War II, Winkelman entered the insurance business.

After City Councilman John M. McDevitt resigned his seat to enter the priesthood, Democratic ward leaders in Northeast Philadelphia's 10th district selected Winkelman to run for the seat in a 1962 special election. He was successful, retaining the seat for the Democrats and defeating Republican Joseph Leo McGlynn, Jr. After taking his seat, Winkelman was assigned to chair the Labor and Civil Service Committee.

Winkelman's term was just over a year, and Democratic primary voters backed him for the nomination to a full term in 1963 over challenger Arnold Lovitz. In the general election in November, however, he lost to Republican David Silver. He remained active in politics  and ran again for council in 1967, losing in the primary despite support from the party hierarchy. After the death of Francis R. Smith in December 1967, Winkelman was elected to succeed him as leader of the 58th ward. In 1971, he was one of 57 candidates for the five Democratic nominations for city council at-large, but was unsuccessful. It marked his last foray into elected politics, and he died in 2007 at the age of 84.

References

Sources

 
 

 
 

 

 

1923 births
2007 deaths
Businesspeople from Philadelphia
Philadelphia City Council members
Pennsylvania Democrats
20th-century American politicians
20th-century American businesspeople
American military personnel of World War II